Pumpkinvine Creek is a stream in the U.S. state of Georgia. It is a tributary of the Etowah River.

Pumpkinvine might be the English translation of a Cherokee name.

See also
List of rivers of Georgia (U.S. state)

References

Rivers of Bartow County, Georgia
Rivers of Paulding County, Georgia
Rivers of Georgia (U.S. state)